Budapest Sportcsarnok was an indoor arena in Budapest, Hungary. The arena had a seating capacity for 12,500 spectators and opened in 1982. It was primarily used for basketball, figure skating, volleyball and other indoor sporting events until it burned down on December 15, 1999. It was replaced by the current Lásló Papp Arena.

It hosted the 1983 European Athletics Indoor Championships, 1986 basketball European Champions cup final in which Cibona Zagreb defeated Žalgiris Kaunas 94–82., 1988 World Figure Skating Championships, 1988 European Athletics Indoor Championships and the 1989 IAAF World Indoor Championships.

References

External links

Unofficial homepage 

1982 establishments in Hungary
1999 disestablishments in Hungary
Burned buildings and structures
Defunct athletics (track and field) venues
Defunct basketball venues
Indoor track and field venues
Sports venues completed in 1982
Sports venues in Budapest
Venues of the Friendship Games
Defunct indoor arenas